Charles George Henry Carr Clark  (1832–1896) was an Australian politician. He was a Member of the Queensland Legislative Assembly.

Early life 
Born in Van Diemen's Land, he was educated in England at Camberwell Collegiate School.

In 1861 he settled in the Darling Downs in Queensland, where he and his brother George established a successful sheep farm.

Politics 
Clark served as in the Legislative Assembly of Queensland from 1871 to 1873 as the Member (MLA) for Warwick. The seat had been held from 1867–1868 by his brother George.

Later life 
Clark died in 1896 and was buried in Tenterfield Cemetery.

References 

1832 births
1896 deaths
Members of the Queensland Legislative Assembly
People from the Darling Downs
People educated at Camberwell Collegiate School
19th-century Australian politicians